The Samsung Galaxy Note 7, commonly known as Note 7, is an Android-based phablet released by Samsung Electronics in 2016.

Note 7 may also refer to:

Smartphones
Infinix Note 7, released by Infinix in 2020
Redmi Note 7, released by Xiaomi in 2019

Other topics
Tegra Note 7, tablet computer designed by Nvidia and released in 2013
The Blue Note 7, American jazz septet founded in 2008